Murtoa is a disused railway station on the Serviceton railway line. Although the station is no longer used as a passenger stop, it is however still an important location for Pacific National as it is where the Hopetoun line junctioned off of the mainline.

Much of the station was extensively altered in the 1980s, following the introduction of CTC between Ararat and Serviceton. The signal box was abolished, the number of roads in the yard was reduced and the local signal panel was only switched in if needed, with the former staff depot closing by the end of 1988. Also during 1988, the former turntable was moved to Dimboola.

The station used to have a dock platform for the Hopetoun branch. People in Murtoa have called on The Overland, the interstate rail journey that runs from Adelaide to Melbourne, to make Murtoa an additional stop for the train service.

References

External links

Disused railway stations in Victoria (Australia)